The Truth About Love Tour was the sixth concert tour by American recording artist P!nk. Sponsored by CoverGirl, and showcasing music from her sixth studio album The Truth About Love (2012), the tour played over 140 shows in Australia, Europe and North America. Shows in Melbourne, Victoria were recorded and released on a concert DVD, The Truth About Love Tour: Live from Melbourne.

Critical response 
The Truth About Love Tour received widespread acclaim from music critics. Jason Bracelin from the Las Vegas Review-Journal called P!nk a: "party girl with a heart of gold", while Jim Harrington from Mercury News said Pink "is the new gold standard", adding that: you definitely don't walk away from a Pink show shrugging your shoulders and muttering 'meh.' It's far more likely that fans practically skip out of the building, feeling extremely satisfied with the experience and determined to tell others to 'go see Pink next time she's in town' [...] Honesty is, as they say, the best policy. And, after watching the Truth About Love Tour, I can honestly say that few, if any, performers deliver better pop spectacles than Pink.

August Brown of the Los Angeles Times opined that P!nk is: "perhaps the most gifted and imaginative physical performer in pop right now." He believed P!nk's set served as a reminder that: "her best asset in performing – more than her aerialist talents or Joplin-esque power-rasp voice, is her self-awareness."

Steve Appleford from Rolling Stone, who was also at the L.A. show, described the vaudeville as a: "grown-up, sophisticated show, and Pink was relaxed and chatty between songs." He went on to praise the singer, adding that: by the time Pink was soaring gracefully through the air on cables stretched across the arena to perform "So What", the singer had demonstrated an epic workout of vocals, stagecraft and stunt-work without missing a note. The night's best special effect was Pink herself. Craig Rosen from The Hollywood Reporter summed up the show with: "P!nk launches back to the top of pop with acrobatic stunts and killer vocals."

After the Houston show, Jane Howze from Culture Map Houston gave a positive review, believing that The Truth About Love show was poised to be 2013's concert of the year. She added:I have always said that Chris Martin, frontman of Coldplay is the hardest working entertainer around, but I’m reconsidering, and now I’m giving Pink the nod. A Pink concert is a little like a Cirque du Soleil performance. There is so much happening on stage—the songs, the dancing and of course the acrobatics—it is a feast for the senses.

Giving a rave review, Sean Daly of Times Pop Music Critic judged P!nk has proven: there are no longer any viable excuses for a performer to ever lip-synch again. If this 33-year-old mom could soulfully belt out opening hit "Raise Your Glass" while boing-boing-ing rafter-high via bungee ropes, the Britney's and Beyoncé's of the Top 40 realm can't claim dance moves or chilly climes as decent reasons to switch off the mike. Of her Palace of Auburn Hills show, Adam Graham of The Detroit News stated: "Tuesday's concert was Pink's first area headlining show since 2002, and she's now entered a master class of pop spectacle providers. She displayed the physicality of Madonna in the way she led her troupe of dancers, and the production was on par with that of any big name pop act".

Mario Tarradel of Dallas News, in his review of P!nk's Dallas show, felt that: It's easy to like Pink. Her rock-charged brand of pop-dance is radio ready, but it's anchored in wit and grit. She's got a pliable voice with lung power and melodic grace. She's unbelievably taut with abs of steel and an adventurous streak. She's got attitude, and no qualms about tossing a few expletives. But mostly Pink is an awesome performer. Pink is a natural., The Toronto Sun complimented P!nk's performing abilities: Pink was up for anything and everything as she bounced around on bungee cords, twirled around on hanging cloths, danced like a modern day Isadora Duncan and in the show's jaw-dropping pentultimate song, "So What", flew around the arena attached to four cables that turned her into a rock n’ roll Tinkerbell. She was equal parts gymnast, singer, dancer and even drummer.

The Star Tribune gave the show an overwhelming review, stating that P!nk:put on arguably the most daring concert in the history of arena rock [...] It was incredibly entertaining — way superior to Madonna's and Lady Gaga's. It set a standard that Rihanna (coming Sunday) and Beyoncé (due in July) will have to live up to.

Jim Farber of NY Daily News gave a rave review of the show, saying that P!nk:reaches new heights in performance that puts her talent, composure on display ... yet it's to Pink's considerable credit that no matter how many bright lights, fast-moving sets or fancy dancers surrounded her, she kept her talent and character front and center. In the end, that's what gave the audience its ultimate high.

Entertainment Weekly gave a glowing review of P!nk's vocals and performing skills: "The "Truth About Love" tour is a lot of things (including game show and circus) but it is one thing above all: a showcase for the power-pop anthem, which Pink pulled and pushed on with a showboating snarl. Do you have to be a Pink fan to enjoy the tour? It's a ridiculous question: you’ll be blasted by almost two hours of music and end up a Pink fan, regardless. The wall-to-wall setlist had its interludes, in the form of spotlit one-offs (a guitar solo; an appearance by a man-in-the-moon straight out of a Méliès short; philosophy from our host of the game show-within-a-tour) and a late-in-the-night turn toward the acoustic. But the audience filled in around even the sound of a lone instrument. This was not the kind of crowd for stillness.

James Reed of The Boston Globe praised her vocals, stating that she is the: "rare performer who handles party anthems ("Raise Your Glass") and heartbreaking ballads ("Just Give Me a Reason") with equal élan."

The Irish Times gave the show an extremely positive review, stating that: as ever with Pink, it is all about the movements, her athleticism, a wow factor that makes Madonna's taught and precise dance scenes on The MDNA Tour seem desperately flat. So here's the key: the reason Pink's live show is one of the best in the world is her live USP, which is aerial athleticism. You can have all the pyro you want at a Rihanna show, and all the ridonkulous costume changes at a Gaga gig, but Pink can FLY. The sense of danger as she descends silks, clambers around a spinning steel globe cage, the Broadway bonanza of her zip-lining into the gods, that's what makes Pink gigs next level. And man do the crowd appreciate it. Screaming women with identikit haircuts whoop her every flex and step. They know that nobody else can do a show like this. It's Pink's territory and hers alone. It's an aesthetic, however, that is also pretty over. While the topic of sex is occasionally apparent in Pink's writing (most awkwardly in ‘**** Like You’), she is a completely different beast to the plastic sex cartoons that Katy Perry, Britney, Christina, Rihanna, and basically every other poptart animate. Some people take all the glory for themselves, but Pink puts on a show, and then acknowledges the hard work from many that goes into it, even if as the remarkable centrepoint to it, she could probably claim all the kudos in the world.

Alice Vincent of The Daily Telegraph gave the show 4/5 stars, praising the show's set list: Pink's set list was well curated from an extensive back catalogue, rewarding hardened fans with a short medley of the early R&B tracks which made her a star. That these were performed with the same genuine enthusiasm as the hits from her last album (her seventh but first to make number one in America), is a testament to Pink's talent, and explains why she continues to sell records. Ten-year-old songs don't sound dated because she has maintained the same energy and sass that she created them with. Ian Gittins of The Guardian gave the show 4/5 stars, conceded that: "Pink may not be the most original singer-songwriter touring the world's enormodomes, nor the most gifted, but she makes up for these shortcomings with a live show akin to a pop-punk take on Cirque du Soleil."

Polly Coufos of The Australian praised P!nk's cover of Cyndi Lauper's "Time After Time": A little later this fearlessness was echoed with her first performance of Cyndi Lauper's Time After Time. She tackled the pop classic with the lyrics in her hand, the tentative reading providing great balance with the precision required for most of the numbers. That may be Pink's greatest asset, that she can create a spectacular show that more than matches her peers, but the glitz never hides the pure, unvarnished talent at her core. The Herald Sun reviewed one of P!nk's 18 Melbourne shows: P!nk's The Truth About Love tour takes concerts to the next level by aiming for the sky. The singing acrobat spends a good third of this new show in the air defying gravity because, unlike 99 per cent of her contemporaries, she can. And even when she's hanging upside down or spinning above your head she's singing completely live. Again, because she can.

Commercial performance 
Over 320,000 tickets for the Australian leg of the tour were sold within a few hours of release. The tour broke records for a solo artist tour in Australia with over 650,000 tickets sold. 200,000 tickets were sold for shows in Melbourne breaking a record P!nk had set herself with 2009's Funhouse Tour. At the 2013 Billboard Touring Awards, Pink won the award for "Top Boxscore".

The first North American leg of tour grossed $28.3 million from 26 shows, with an average gross per city of $1,134,385. The European leg grossed $30.7 million. The nine-week leg of Australia was expected to generate $100 million.

In Australia, initial grosses reported topped $31.6 million ($29.2 million) from two venues in Sydney and one in Brisbane, however that total did not include the four-night stint in the city of Adelaide, and a record-breaking eighteen shows in Melbourne.

The Truth About Love Tour was the third highest-grossing tour of 2013 behind Bon Jovi, and Cirque du Soleil's Michael Jackson The Immortal World Tour. P!nk was also the third highest grossing female touring artist of 2013, behind Beyoncé and Taylor Swift.

Records 
The Truth About Love Tour broke two records at the Rod Laver Arena, in Melbourne, Australia. P!nk is the artist who has performed the most shows at the venue, with a significant 18 sold-out shows on The Truth About Love Tour. This record surpassed her previous 17-show record at the venue during her 2009 Funhouse Tour. She was also the first artist to sell more than 250,000 tickets at the venue. On August 26, 2013, P!nk was rewarded a plaque backstage, a second pink pole, a star at the venue's entrance and Door 18 was painted pink.

P!nk broke Kylie Minogue's record of most concerts by a female performer at the Entertainment Centre having played twenty-six shows at the venue. Her four sold-out shows at the Allphones Arena in Sydney with more than 67,000 tickets sold, broke the record set by fellow popstar Britney Spears in 2009 with her The Circus Tour.

After playing to nearly 15,000 fans per night in Perth, P!nk now also holds the record for most performances by an artist at the Perth Arena, as well as the top four attended events at the venue.

Michael Coppel, President and CEO of Live Nation Australia, thanked P!nk for spending three months on tour in this country. "Everyone at LNA has been thrilled to be involved in Pink's record breaking tour, continuing a decade-long association with an artist who continues to set new standards and who has now sold in excess of 1.5 million tickets in Australia."

The pop star broke her own mark at Melbourne's Rod Laver Arena with the 18th sold-out performance, having set a house record in 2009 with seventeen shows on her Funhouse tour. The combined gross of $29.2 million (US$) in Melbourne was the largest gross for any headliner at a single venue in 2013.

P!nk also sold out the KFC Yum!, in the process becoming the highest-grossing female artist to play the arena to date.

Development 
To transport and set up the tour, there was a chartered 747 jumbo jet, nineteen semi-trailers, and eighty crew members to set up  400 tons of equipment. She also opened her first pop-up store which featured things that are not normally available at her concerts. Merchandise included autographed items, backstage passes, T-shirts, key rings, show tickets, etc.

Recordings
Truth About Love Tour: Live From Melbourne was released in November 2013 on DVD.

Set list 
The following set list is representative of the show in Melbourne. It is not representative of all concerts for the duration of the tour.

"Raise Your Glass"
"Walk of Shame"
"Just Like a Pill"
"U + Ur Hand"
"Leave Me Alone (I'm Lonely)"
"Try"
"Wicked Game"
"Just Give Me a Reason"
"Trouble"
"Are We All We Are"
"How Come You're Not Here"
"Sober"
"The Great Escape"
"Who Knew"
”Time After Time”
"Fuckin' Perfect"
"Most Girls" / "There You Go" / "You Make Me Sick"
"Slut Like You"
"Blow Me (One Last Kiss)"
Encore
"So What"

Notes
 During the first leg of the tour, "Glitter in the Air" was performed as the final song. Moreover, "Family Portrait" was performed at selected dates (like in Los Angeles on February 16, 2013).
 At selected dates in Australia, P!nk performed an acoustic version of Cyndi Lauper's "Time After Time".
 Nate Ruess joined Pink onstage during the performance of "Just Give Me a Reason" in Hamburg on May 1, 2013.

Shows

Cancelled shows

Notes

References

External links 
Official tour website

Pink (singer) concert tours
2013 concert tours
2014 concert tours
Concert tours of Australia
Concert tours of Canada
Concert tours of Europe
Concert tours of France
Concert tours of Germany
Concert tours of Ireland
Concert tours of North America
Concert tours of Oceania
Concert tours of the United Kingdom
Concert tours of the United States